Imavere Parish was a rural municipality of Estonia, in Järva County. It had a population of 1,025 (2006) and an area of 139 km².

Villages
, Imavere Parish had 13 villages:
Eistvere, Hermani, Imavere, Jalametsa, Järavere, Kiigevere, Käsukonna, Laimetsa, Puiatu, Pällastvere, Taadikvere, Tammeküla and Võrevere.

References

 
Populated places in Järva County